Rajya Sabha elections were held in 1986, to elect members of the Rajya Sabha, Indian Parliament's upper chamber.

Elections
Elections were held in 1986 to elect members from various states.
The list is incomplete.

Members elected
The following members are elected in the elections held in 1986. They are members for the term 1986-92 and retire in year 1992, except in case of the resignation or death before the term.

State - Member - Party

Bye-elections
The following bye elections were held in the year 1986.

State - Member - Party

 Gujarat - Sagar Rayka- INC ( ele 27/01/1986 term till 1988)
 West Bengal - T S Gurung - CPM ( ele 14/03/1986 term till 1990) dea 13/01/1989
 Nominated -  Ela Bhatt - NOM  ( ele 12/05/1986 term till 1988)
 Madya Pradesh - Veena Verma - INC ( ele 26/06/1986 term till 1988)
 West Bengal - Ramnarayan Goswami - CPM ( ele 22/10/1986 term till 1987)
 West Bengal - Samar Mukherjee - CPM ( ele 29/12/1986 term till 1987)

References

1986 elections in India
1986